Barstar is a small protein synthesized by the bacterium Bacillus amyloliquefaciens. Its function is to inhibit the ribonuclease activity of its binding partner barnase, with which it forms an extraordinarily tightly bound complex within the cell until barnase is secreted. Expression of barstar is necessary to counter the lethal effect of expressed active barnase. The structure of the barnase-barstar complex is known.

References 

Bacterial proteins